Group B of the 2013 CONCACAF Gold Cup was one of three groups competing of nations at 2013 CONCACAF Gold Cup. The group's first round of matches were played on July 8, with the final round played on July 15. All six group matches were played at venues in the United States, in Harrison, NJ, Miami Gardens, FL and Houston. The group consisted of Haiti, Honduras, El Salvador and Trinidad and Tobago.

Standings

All times given are (UTC−4)

El Salvador vs Trinidad and Tobago

Haiti vs Honduras

Trinidad and Tobago vs Haiti

Honduras vs El Salvador

El Salvador vs Haiti

Honduras vs Trinidad and Tobago

References

External links
Official website 

B